Filip Starzyński (born 27 May 1991) is a Polish professional footballer who plays as an attacking midfielder for Zagłębie Lubin.

Career statistics

Club

International

Scores and results list Poland's goal tally first, score column indicates score after each Starzyński goal.

References

External links

Living people
1991 births
Sportspeople from Szczecin
Polish footballers
Association football midfielders
Poland international footballers
Poland under-21 international footballers
UEFA Euro 2016 players
Ekstraklasa players
Belgian Pro League players
Ruch Chorzów players
Zagłębie Lubin players
K.S.C. Lokeren Oost-Vlaanderen players
Polish expatriate footballers
Polish expatriate sportspeople in Belgium
Expatriate footballers in Belgium